Cornwall is a town in Litchfield County, Connecticut, United States. The population was 1,567 at the 2020 census.

History
The town of Cornwall, Connecticut, is named after the county of Cornwall, England. The town was incorporated in 1740, nearly four decades before the United States declared its independence. The town encompasses three distinct townships: Cornwall Bridge and West Cornwall, each bordered by the Housatonic River to the west, and Cornwall Village, located three miles east of the river. One significant natural feature is the vast amount of forested land, including hundreds of acres of Mohawk State Forest, resulting in Cornwall often being called “the “Greenest Town in Connecticut”.
The proximity of its settlements to the Housatonic River offered an efficient means of transporting materials and goods, which helped stimulate Cornwall's early farming economy as well as assisting in the evolution of business and industry. During the 19th century and the arrival of the Industrial Revolution, the town maintained two furnaces, including a blast furnace, to support charcoal-making industries. Cornwall was home to the Foreign Mission School, dating to 1817, as well as the Cream Hill Agricultural School in 1845, whose property, still an active farmstead, was listed on the National Register of Historic Places in 1976. Cornwall has long been known as the “Home of the Covered Bridge,” which has spanned the Housatonic River since 1864. One of only three surviving covered bridges in Connecticut, the bridge is a popular tourist destination and among the most-photographed locations in the state.
Modern-day Cornwall continues to reflect its rural farming character while being home to arts, culture, artisans and entrepreneurs. Its convenience to major metropolitan areas makes it attractive for year-round and second-home residents.

In 1939 poet Mark Van Doren wrote "The Hills of Little Cornwall", in which the seductive beauties of the countryside were portrayed:

The mind, eager for caresses,
Lies down at its own risk in Cornwall;

Cornwall also makes a glancing appearance in Wallace Stevens's late poem "Reality is an Activity of the Most August Imagination."

Cornwall played a role in the establishment of Christianity in the Hawaiian islands after a native Hawaiian tragically died here of Typhus in 1818. This tragedy was instrumental in the Congregational church's 1820 outreach to the ‘Sandwich Islands’ at Kona, Hawaii.

Geography
Cornwall is in northwestern Litchfield County. It is bordered to the north by the town of Canaan, to the east by Goshen, to the south by Warren, to the southwest by Kent, and to the west, across the Housatonic River, by Sharon. The town contains a major portion of Mohawk State Forest.

Principal communities
Cornwall (has its own ZIP Code for a specific P.O. box)
Cornwall Bridge (has its own post office)
Cornwall Hollow
East Cornwall
West Cornwall (has its own post office)

Demographics

As of the census of 2000, there were 1,434 people, 615 households, and 389 families residing in the town. There were 873 housing units at an average density of 19.0 per square mile (7.3/km2). The racial makeup of the town was 97.49% White, 0.21% African American, 0.70% Asian, 0.21% from other races, and 1.39% from two or more races. Hispanic or Latino of any race were 1.46% of the population.

There were 615 households, out of which 29.4% had children under the age of 18 living with them, 52.5% were married couples living together, 8.5% had a female householder with no husband present, and 36.6% were non-families. 30.7% of all households were made up of individuals, and 12.0% had someone living alone who was 65 years of age or older.  The average household size was 2.33 and the average family size was 2.93.

In the town, the population was spread out, with 24.4% under the age of 18, 3.3% from 18 to 24, 25.7% from 25 to 44, 28.9% from 45 to 64, and 17.6% who were 65 years of age or older.  The median age was 44 years. For every 100 females, there were 94.0 males.  For every 100 females age 18 and over, there were 90.5 males.

The median income for a household in the town was $54,886, and the median income for a family was $64,750. Males had a median income of $46,875 versus $30,536 for females. The per capita income for the town was $42,484.  About 1.0% of families and 3.0% of the population were below the poverty line, including 3.0% of those under age 18 and 1.6% of those age 65 or over.

Some of the main features of Cornwall include the Cream Hill Lake, the Covered Bridge, Mohawk Ski Mountain and the town which contains a library and tennis courts.

Education

Cornwall is a member of Regional School District 01, which also includes the towns of Canaan, Kent, North Canaan, Salisbury, and Sharon. Public school students attend the Cornwall Consolidated School for grades K–8 and Housatonic Valley Regional High School for grades 9–12.

Arts and culture
The Cornwall Library, organized in 1869, constructed a new building in 2002 that houses a collection of over 28,000 items. It sponsors art shows, lectures, a Books & Bloom sale and tour, along with many other events.

The Cornwall Chronicle is a non-profit monthly newspaper that publishes news and feature stories about Cornwall, a calendar of events, and drawings by local artists. It was started in 1991 and has not missed an issue since.

The Rose Algrant Show is an exhibit of works in all media by artists from Cornwall, Connecticut over the age of 18. It has been held annually since 1959 (2020 was online).

Museums and other points of interest

Cathedral Pines – a  nature conservatory and old-growth forest
Cornwall Bridge – concrete arch bridge built in 1930 and listed on the National Register of Historic Places in 2004
Cornwall Bridge Railroad Station – added to the National Register of Historic Places in 1972
Cornwall Historical Society – located in a converted carriage barn, features annual exhibits on Cornwall's history
House VI ("the Frank residence") – an example of Deconstructivist architecture
Mohawk Mountain Ski Area – a ski resort
West Cornwall Covered Bridge – listed on the National Register of Historic Places in 1975

The town was home to the Foreign Mission School between 1817 and 1826.

Infrastructure

Transportation

The town is served by Connecticut Route 4, U.S. Route 7, and Connecticut Routes 43, 125 and 128. Route 4 leads east  to Torrington and west  to Sharon, while Route 7 leads north  to North Canaan and south  to New Milford. Routes 43, 125 and 128 are entirely within the town of Cornwall, Route 43 running from North Corners near Cornwall village to Cornwall Hollow, Route 128 running from North Corners to West Cornwall, and Route 125 running from Cornwall Village north to Route 128.

The covered bridge in West Cornwall, crossing the Housatonic River, is one of only three covered bridges in Litchfield County.

Notable people

 Ethan Allen (1738–1789), Revolutionary War hero (Green Mountain Boys) and co-founder of the state of Vermont
 Ira Allen (1751–1814), one of the founders of Vermont
 Major Andre Andrews (1792–1834), mayor of Buffalo, New York
 Norman Dorsen (1930–2017), Law Professor, former president American Civil Liberties Union
 Edward L. Ferman (born 1937), editor and publisher, most notably of The Magazine of Fantasy and Science Fiction
 Theodore Sedgwick Gold (1818–1906), Connecticut state secretary of the board of agriculture
 Ralph C. Harrison (1833–1918), attorney and Supreme Court of California justice
 Tom Jones (born 1928), composer, The Fantasticks
 Alexandra Paul (born 1963), actress; raised in Cornwall
 Oliver Platt (born 1960), actor
 Tim Prentice (born 1930), sculptor
 Abraham A. Ribicoff (1910–1998), governor of Connecticut and U.S. senator
 Roxana Robinson (born 1946), novelist and biographer
 John Sedgwick (1813–1864), Union Army general killed by a sniper at the Battle of Spotsylvania Court House
 Oscar Serlin (1901–1971), Broadway producer, Life with Father
 Marc Simont (1915–2013), artist, political cartoonist and illustrator of children's books
 Richard Schlesinger, veteran CBS News correspondent
 James Thurber (1894–1961), author (The Secret Life of Walter Mitty), cartoonist and celebrated wit
 Adam Van Doren, watercolorist and author
 Charles Van Doren (1926–2019), historian, notable quiz show contestant, resident
 Mark Van Doren (1894–1972), poet and teacher
 Sam Waterston (born 1940), actor; lives in West Cornwall
 Josepha Newcomb Whitney (1871–1957), suffragist, pacifist, elected to Connecticut legislature

References

External links

Official website
Cornwall Consolidated School
Cornwall Library
Cornwall Historical Society
The Cornwall Chronicle 
The Lakeville Journal
Housatonic Valley Regional High School in Falls Village
Cornwall, Connecticut, at City-Data.com

 
Towns in Litchfield County, Connecticut
Towns in the New York metropolitan area
Towns in Connecticut